I Will Follow is the tenth studio album by Christian musician Jeremy Camp. Stolen Pride Records in association with Sparrow Records and Capitol Christian Music Group released the album on February 3, 2015. Camp worked with Bernie Herms and Seth Mosley on the production of this album. Tom Camp, Jeremy's father, plays harmonica on the track "Can't Be Moved", as well as his daughters, Isabella and Arianne, contributing background vocals. The lead single, "He Knows", was inspired by fans who asked him questions on how he dealt with losing his first wife to cancer, following the release of his autobiography, "I Still Believe". He then used those questions to help him write the song.

Reception

Mark Deming, giving the album three stars for AllMusic, writes, "I Will Follow demonstrates he remains a man with sincere and strong belief in the Lord, and a desire to share his testimony with the world." Signaling in a four star review by CCM Magazine, Grace S. Aspinwall recognizes, "a solid record bathed in scripture, and saturated with a more mature sound from Camp" because it "represents a grown-up version of the artist, and it's a stalwart and near-perfect effort." Caitlin Lassiter, indicating in a four and a half star review at New Release Tuesday, realizes, "The overarching theme of I Will Follow is to continue walking the path God has laid out for us, no matter how unexpected or uncomfortable...as much as the vocals and lyrics will be part of its success, the incredible instrumentation and background vocals stand out as a major part of why I Will Follow is such a well-rounded effort." Specifying in a five star review from Worship Leader, Steve Reed replies, "I Will Follow is an amazing collection of musical expressions from the legendary Jeremy Camp... From ambient, to rock, to acoustic, it all works together to make this album fresh and relevant." Tony Cummings, representing in a nine out of ten review by Cross Rhythms, reckons, "Listening to this outstanding song and indeed the whole album leads me to the conclusion that those jaundiced reviewers are badly undervaluing Jeremy's talent." In a three star review from Jesus Freak Hideout, Christopher Smith responds, "the lackluster lyrics and unoriginal musical formula drag this album down. That's not to say this is a bad album--in its weakest moments I Will Follow is average and in its best moments it is enjoyable." Jonathan Andre, awarding the album four and a half stars at 365 Days of Inspiring Media, writes, "Jeremy displays- a sense of maturity within these tracks." Awarding the album three stars from CM Addict, Andrew Funderburk says, "I Will Follow seems to be taking a small step back into how passionate and real his music used to be." Lindsay Williams, awarding the album four stars at The Sound Opinion, writes, "I Will Follow is easily the best addition to Camp’s discography thus far." Rating the album four and a half stars for Louder Than the Music, Jono Davies says, "Jeremy has started the year with a massive pop bang." Laura Chambers, awarding the album a 4.2 out of five at Christian Music Review, writes, "With a voice full of raw love, craving, longing, and hope, Jeremy Camp's desire couldn’t be any clearer". Rating the album an eight and a half stars for Jesus Wired, Rebekah Joy says, "I Will Follow is a great album full of emotional, worship, and soul-filled songs." Christian St. John, awarding the album five stars for Christian Review Magazine, writes, "I Will Follow is a release Mr. Camp can be proud of."

Track listing

Personnel
Tracks 1–4, 6–11

 Seth Mosley – producer, recording engineer, vocal editing, editing, bass guitar, guitars, programming, keyboards, background vocals
 Recording studio – Blackbird Studio A, Nashville, Tennessee
 Recording studio – Full Circle Music, Franklin, Tennessee
 Mike "X" O'Connor – recording engineer, vocal editing, editing
 Celi Mosley – production coordination
 Dave Hagan – vocal editing
 Keith Everett Smith – vocal editing
 Jerricho Scoggins – audio editing
 Jeremy Camp – lead vocals, guitars, background vocals
 Ben Phillips – drums
 Miles McPherson – drums
 Leif Skartland – drums, background vocals
 Tony Lucido – bass guitar
 Walt Smith – bass guitar, background vocals
 Mike Payne – guitars
 Toby Friesen – guitars, background vocals
 Andrew DeRoberts – guitars
 Tim Lauer – programming and keyboards
 Donnie Cox – programming, keyboards, background vocals
 Adie Camp – background vocals
 Matt Balm – background vocals, vocal coaching
 Isabella Camp – background vocals 
 Arianne Camp – background vocals
 Tom Camp – harmonica on "Can't Be Moved"
 Mark Endert – mixing (tracks 1–4)
 Sean Moffitt – mixing (tracks 6–11)

Track 5
 Bernie Herms – producer, recording engineer, piano, keyboards, programming
 Luke Fredrickson  – producer, recording engineer
 Recording studio – Soul Fuel Studios, Nashville, Tennessee
 Sean Moffitt – mixing
 Andy Selby – editing
 Jeremy Camp – lead, backing vocals
 Fred Williams – additional programming
 Luke Fredrickson – guitars

Additional credits
 Brad O'Donnell – A&R
 Ted Jensen – mastering
 Mastering location – Sterling Sound, New York City
 Becca Wildsmith – art and design
 David Bean – photography
 Kris Whipple – grooming
 Tasia Treimer – styling

Charts

References 

2015 albums
Jeremy Camp albums
Sparrow Records albums